Goeke is a surname. Notable people with the surname include:

J. Henry Goeke (1869–1930), American politician
Joseph Robert Goeke (born 1950), American judge
Leo Goeke (1937–2012), American operatic tenor

See also
Goeze